The 1st Guam Legislature was a meeting of the Guam Legislature. It convened in Hagatna, Guam on January 5, 1951 and ended on January 3, 1953.

The 1st Guam Legislature was elected in the 1950 Guamanian legislative election.

Leadership

Legislative
 Speaker: Antonio Won Pat
 Vice Speaker: Frank D. Perez
 Legislative Secretary: Dorothea San Nicolas
 Sergeant-at-Arms: Jose Blas
 Executive Secretary: Maria Duenas

Membership

References 

Politics of Guam
Political organizations based in Guam
Legislature of Guam